Américo González, also known as Américo, was a former Salvadoran footballer and coach.

He was the first Salvadoran coach to coach the national football team.

Honours
International
Central American and Caribbean Games Bronze Medal (1): 1935

External links
  (highlighted as player of the national team and coaches)

Year of birth missing
Salvadoran footballers
Salvadoran football managers
Central American and Caribbean Games bronze medalists for El Salvador
Competitors at the 1935 Central American and Caribbean Games
Association football defenders
Central American and Caribbean Games medalists in football